Drumcondra, Clonliffe and Glasnevin is a former second-tier local government area within County Dublin. It was created as a township in 1878. In 1899, it briefly became an urban district, before being abolished in 1900, with its area absorbed into the city of Dublin.

Area
The Township of Drumcondra, Clonliffe and Glasnevin, governed by town commissioners, was created by the Drumcondra, Clonliffe and Glasnevin Township Act 1878, including the districts of Drumcondra, Clonliffe and Glasnevin, in the barony of Coolock and county of Dublin. In 1899, it became an urban district under the Local Government (Ireland) Act 1898.

In 1900, the urban district was abolished and the area was transferred from the county into the jurisdiction of the city of Dublin.

References

Further reading

Notes

External links
 Drumcondra, Clonliffe and Glasnevin Township layer on OpenStreetMap
 Dublin Historic Maps: Dublin Townships and Urban Districts, between 1847 and 1930
 Dublin Historic Maps: Dublin City historical limits, Between 1840 and 1953.
 Townlands in Co. Dublin

History of County Dublin
Local government in County Dublin
Former local authorities in the Republic of Ireland